The M234 Riot Control Launcher is an M16 series rifle or M4 series carbine attachment firing a M755 Grenade round. The M234 mounts on the muzzle, bayonet lug and front sight post of the M16.  It fires either the M734 64 mm Kinetic Riot Control or the M742 64 mm CSI Riot Control Ring Airfoil Projectiles.  The latter produces a 4 to 5 foot tear gas cloud on impact.  The launcher is capable of firing from 4 to 6 projectiles per minute.  The velocity is sufficiently high to prevent dodging by target individuals at effective ranges.  The effective range of the projectile is 40 meters on an individual and 60 meters on groups of individuals with a maximum range of 100 meters.  The main advantage to using Ring Airfoil Projectiles is that their design does not allow them be thrown back by rioters with any real effect.  The M234 is no longer used by United States forces.  It has been replaced by the M203 40mm grenade launcher and nonlethal ammunition.

Ring airfoil projectile

The ring airfoil projectile (RAP) is designed as an incapacitant. The original design used kinetic and tear gas projectiles for use in the M234 Riot Control Launcher. The design of the RAP is an aerodynamic, circular-tubed-shaped munition that discharges tear gas on impact and/or uses blunt force trauma to subdue or deter a subject. The main advantage to using RAPs is that their design does not allow them be thrown back by rioters with any real effect.

See also
 List of individual weapons of the U.S. Armed Forces
 Riot control

External links
   Army Field Manual, FM19-15

Riot guns